Allan Webb may refer to:
 Allan Webb (bishop)
 Allan Webb (American football)

See also
 Alan Webb (disambiguation)